Colonial troops or colonial army refers to various military units recruited from, or used as garrison troops in, colonial territories.

Colonial background 
Such colonies may lie overseas or in areas dominated by neighbouring land powers such as Imperial China or Tsarist Russia. Colonial troops have been used by Imperial powers whether ancient (such as Carthage
and Rome), or modern (such as Great Britain, France, Netherlands, Denmark, the United States, Germany, Italy, Japan, Spain, and Portugal). Sometimes they have been recruited under local leaders, as auxiliaries; and at other times organised directly by the colonial power.

Origins 
At the beginning of the modern colonial period such troops were predominantly Europeans from the home army of the country concerned, but locally raised "native" troops were soon recruited. The latter normally served in separate units, at first under their own leaders, later under European officers.

The sepoys of the East India Company were an early example. By the mid 18th century, these troops were beginning to be directly recruited by the Company, allowing more systematic provisioning, drill and tactics, forming the presidency armies. During the Indian Rebellion of 1857, or "Sepoy Mutiny", many of the sepoys rebelled against the Company, leading to the end of Company rule in India. After the British government took direct control of British India in 1858, the sepoys formed the regiments of the Indian Army, some of which survive to the present day in the national armies of Pakistan and India.

The French and Portuguese enclaves in the Indian subcontinent also recruited sepoys.

Basis of recruitment 

In the larger colonial possessions the garrison was likely to comprise both locally recruited and white troops. The latter might be from the home or metropolitan army, from settlers doing their military service or occasionally from mercenaries recruited outside the territories of the colonial power concerned. The French "Army of Africa" garrisoning Algeria, Morocco and Tunisia comprised all of these elements. The Dutch had a similar mix of locally recruited and metropolitan troops composing their garrison in the East Indies. While the Sikhs, Punjabis, Marathas, Rajputs, Jats, Baluchis and other "martial races" making up the bulk of the Indian Army were recruited from British subjects, the ten regiments of Gurkha Rifles were recruited from outside British-controlled territory. In Burma, the British recruited primarily from the Hill dwelling minorities such as the Karens, Kachin and Chin while preventing the plain dwelling majority of Bamar, Rakhine and Mon people from joining the colonial military service; this was due to the perception that they were unsympathetic towards the colonial government.

Many colonial powers sought to recruit minority peoples, such as the Ambonese in the Netherlands East Indies (NEI), to counterbalance majority populations seen as potentially rebellious, such as the Javanese. Such minority groups, and those with records of loyalty in revolt, were often designated as 'martial races'; their supposedly superior martial qualities propagandized, and their communities rewarded with special status. The colonial power might face however a dilemma: when military developments made numbers a priority, it had to either trust the majority and so risk loss of control, or alternatively to rely on minorities combined with large numbers of expensive European or other non-local troops. The French Army of the Levant provided an example of the latter option. Raised to garrison Syria and Lebanon from 1920 to 1943, this force of about 10,000 men (in 1938) was predominantly recruited from Alawite, Druze, Kurdish and Circassian minorities, augmented by North African, Senegalese and French Foreign Legion units. 
 
The British Army rotated large numbers of its regular troops through India and other overseas possessions, augmenting the local colonial forces. However it is notable that British forces in Nigeria and other West African territories were under normal circumstances nearly all locally recruited, except for officers, some non-commissioned officers and a few specialists.

Changes in colonial ruler usually meant the continuation of local recruitment - often from the same sources. Both the Spanish and United States rulers of the Philippines employed Filipino troops from the same regions and tribal groups. In the 1830s the original zouaves were volunteers from a tribal group which provided mercenaries for both the Turkish and French rulers of Algeria.

Settler militia 
Colonial troops may comprise local forces drawn from settlers in colonies where these were numerous. In the 18th century militia units were raised in Colonial America. A large portion of the forces maintained by Spain and Portugal in South and Central America until the early 19th century were locally recruited. Colonial militias in Australia, Canada and New Zealand formed the origins of the modern armies of these countries.

Advantages 
The advantages of locally-recruited troops in colonial warfare were several. They had familiarity with local terrain, language and culture. They were likely to be immune from disease in areas such as the West Indies and West Africa, which were notoriously unhealthy for European troops until the early 20th century. "Native" troops were usually recruited from tribal or other groups that had long-established martial traditions. It was not uncommon for colonial armies to favour the races that had shown the fiercest opposition to the initial conquest of a given territory (examples being the Sikhs of India and the Rif tribesmen of Morocco). Colonial units could be employed in campaigns or conditions in which the use of conscripts from metropolitan regiments would be politically unpopular. Also, the use of local troops often made the actual colonization more palatable for the locals.

Colonial troops could be used to garrison or subdue other territories than those in which they were recruited to avoid problems of conflicting loyalties. For example, Italy used Eritrean askaris in Libya and during both wars with Ethiopia (1895 and 1936). Indian regiments garrisoned Aden, Singapore and Hong Kong at various times in the 19th and the early 20th centuries. In the 1950s, the Portuguese used African troops from Mozambique to garrison Goa, and the Dutch had West Africans (Zwarte Hollanders) for service in the East Indies during much of the 19th century.

Disadvantages 

Colonial troops were usually more lightly equipped than their metropolitan counterparts, which were usually given priority in issuing new weaponry. That arose primarily from the predominant roles of light infantry or cavalry of colonial forces, which were designed for low intensity warfare against poorly-armed opponents in difficult country. Until the Second World War, artillery or mechanised units rarely had indigenous troops although the Italian colonial army maintained a number of Eritrean, Somali and Libyan mule artillery batteries, and there were locally-recruited mountain batteries in the Indian Army. The relative lack of up-to-date weaponry and training put colonial troops at an initial disadvantage when they faced modern opponents such as the German or Japanese armies of the Second World War.

Even earlier, the African and Indian troops that had been sent to France in 1914 encountered a climate, diet and general conditions of service greatly different from those with which they were familiar. The Senegalese tirailleurs of the French Army had to be withdrawn to southern France for recuperation and training during the harsh winters of the Western Front. All Indian troops, with the exception of some cavalry regiments, were withdrawn from the Western Front in October 1915, to serve in Mesopotamia, Palestine and East Africa.

On the other hand, the regiments of the Indian Army were an army in their own right with responsibilities in the wider Empire. They were equipped as such, apart from lacking certain specialist capabilities and took on the Ottomans, the Germans, the Italians and later the Japanese more or less on their own but were sometimes accompanied by a substantial British presence. In the early stages of the First World War (November 1914), a British-Indian expeditionary force suffered a major defeat by well-trained and well-led German askaris (Schutztruppe) at the Battle of Tanga, in East Africa, but two divisions of Indian infantry also fought with distinction in France in a type of war and a climate for which they had been little prepared. 

The selective recruitment of particular ethnic groups for service in the colonial military was frequently influenced by the perception of their military abilities and loyalty towards the colonial regime. On occasion, these restrictions were overturned due to a lack of manpower, especially during and in the run-up to the Second World War.

Use outside areas of origin 
By the 20th Century, colonial troops were often being used outside the boundaries of their territories of origin. Troops from France's North African colonies served in the Crimean War, the Franco-Prussian War and most notably in the trenches of World War I in France itself. France used African troops in World War II and during the subsequent Indochina and Algerian Wars. Indian troops served in Europe in large numbers during both World Wars, as well as in the Middle East, Malaya, Burma and North Africa in World War II. The Regulares (Moorish infantry and cavalry) of Spanish Morocco
played a major role in the Spanish Civil War of 1936-39. Japan recruited levies from Korea and Taiwan during the period of colonial rule in both countries. Italy employed Dubats from Italian Somaliland, together with Eritrean and Libyan units in the conquest of Ethiopia during 1936; Eritrean troops were also used in the occupation of Libya from 1911 to 1935 and a full division of Libyan infantry participated in the Ethiopian campaign. Portugal employed Landim troops from Mozambique in Angola during World War I, also using them in the garrisons of Portuguese India and Macau until the 1950s. During the 19th century several thousand West African soldiers were recruited under the name of Belanda Hitam by the Dutch colonial authorities for military service in the Netherlands East Indies.

United States
Prior to the passage of the Jones–Shafroth Act in 1917, granting full U.S. citizenship to Puerto Ricans, the U.S. Army's 65th Infantry Regiment, was made up of Puerto Rican enlistees and a mix of American and Puerto Rican officers. The unit was formed in 1899, immediately following America's annexation of the colony in the Spanish–American War. The demographic composition of the 65th stayed generally the same after 1917 (though composed of U.S. citizens it was no longer be a "colonial" regiment), and went onto to serve with distinction in every major U.S. conflict since. 

The U.S. Army also organized and trained multiple colonial units during the American colonization of the Philippines from 1901 until 1946 when the Philippines became independent. These troops including the Philippine Scouts (most notably), the Philippine Constabulary and eventually the Philippine Army in general. They were usually trained by the United States military and initially led by American officers. Philippine colonial soldiers were amongst the first members of the U.S. Army to engage in direct combat against the Japanese during World War II.

Symbolism 

Colonial troops sometimes served as symbols or icons of Imperial power. Representative detachments of Indian and other Empire forces came to London to parade as part of coronation or other major celebrations during the late nineteenth and twentieth centuries. French tirailleurs and spahis paraded in Paris on the 14th July each year until 1962. Until at least the 1930s, British Indian and French, Italian and Spanish North African regiments were notable for their picturesque uniforms which incorporated indigenous features such as colourful turbans, cloaks and sashes. Such features were an aid to voluntary recruiting as well as ensuring a high-profile for the overseas territories represented.

End of empires 
The end of the colonial empires saw mixed outcomes for colonial troops. Where the transition was a relatively peaceful one the existing colonial units were likely to form the basis of the new national armies. Where there had been extended conflict those locally recruited troops who had remained loyal to their former colonial rulers might find themselves regarded as collaborators and subject to reprisals after independence. This was particularly the case in Algeria in 1962 (see Harkis) and in Guinea-Bissau during 1973/74.

Examples

References

Further reading 
 
 Karl Hack and Tobias Rettig, eds. (2006), Colonial Armies in Southeast Asia.
 
 R. Hure (1977), L' Armee d' Afrique 1830-1962.
 Philip Mason (1974), A Matter of Honour - an account of the Indian Army.  .

See also 
 Auxiliaries
 Paramilitary
 Foreign legion
 Foreign volunteers
 Militia
 Mercenary
 Irregular military

 
Types of military forces
Infantry